The New Greek Telescope project of the National Observatory of Athens (NOA) was funded by the European Commission and the General Secretariat for Research and Technology of the Hellenic Ministry of Development. The telescope had its first light test in 2005, and became the largest telescope in Greece when it became fully operational at the Chelmos Observatory site in 2007.  The telescope is operated by the Institute for Astronomy, Astrophysics, Space Applications and Remote Sensing (IAASARS) of the NOA. It is part of the OPTICON consortium of medium size telescopes.

The telescope, built by Carl Zeiss AG, has a Ritchey-Chrétien configuration with a primary mirror with a diameter of 2.3 m.  At the main f/8 Cassegrain focus, the corrected field of view is approximately one degree, with a plate scale of 1.17 arcsec/mm.
It has an Altazimuth mount.  The telescope is housed in a tower 35 meters away from the control building, so that heat and vibrations from human activity, automobiles and computers will not affect the telescope's performance. The telescope was designed to support remote observing.

Observations with the Aristarchos telescope have provided a measurement of the distance to the planetary nebula KjPn 8.

See also
List of largest optical reflecting telescopes

References

External links

OPTICON Network

Optical telescopes
Astronomy in Greece